Out of the Unknown is a collection of fantasy short stories by Canadian writers A. E. van Vogt and E. Mayne Hull, a married couple. It was first published in 1948 by Fantasy Publishing Company, Inc. in an edition of 1,000 copies. The stories originally appeared in the magazine Unknown.

Contents
 "The Sea Thing" by A. E. van Vogt
 "The Wishes We Make" by E. Mayne Hull
 "The Witch" by A. E. van Vogt
 "The Patient" by E. Mayne Hull
 "The Ultimate Wish" by E. Mayne Hull
 "The Ghost" by A. E. van Vogt

Sources

External links
 
 

1948 short story collections
Fantasy short story collections
Short story collections by A. E. van Vogt
 1948 anthologies
Fantasy anthologies
Fantasy Publishing Company, Inc. books